The Vasile Alecsandri University of Bacău is a public university in Romania, located in Bacău. Named in honor of the poet Vasile Alecsandri, it was founded in 1990.

History
The first higher education school in Bacău was founded in 1961 as the Pedagogical Institute of Bacău. In 1984 it was transformed into the Sub-Engineering Institute, subordinated to the Technical University of Iași. In 1990, the institution became a university.

Timeline
1961: the Pedagogical Institute of Bacău is founded (three faculties: Humanities, Mathematics, and Natural Sciences)
1964: the Faculties of History and Geography, and Physical Education are added
1976: renamed as the Institute of Higher Education of Bacău
1976: Faculty of Engineering is founded
1984: renamed as the Institute of Associate Engineering (part of the Gheorghe Asachi Polytechnic Institute of Iași)
1985: Inorganic Chemistry Technology study programme is introduced
1986: Power Engineering study programme is introduced
1990: renamed as the University of Bacău (two faculties: Engineering, and Letters and Sciences)
1996: the Department of Physical Education and Sports (part of the Faculty of Letters and Sciences) is transformed into the Faculty of Physical Education and Sports
2002: the Faculty of Letters and Sciences is split into two faculties (Letters, and Sciences)
2004: the Department of Economic Sciences (part of the Faculty of Sciences) is transformed into the Faculty of Economic Sciences
2009: renamed as the Vasile Alecsandri University of Bacău

Faculties
The University of Bacău has 5 faculties:
Faculty of Economic Sciences
Faculty of Engineering
Faculty of Letters
Faculty of Movement, Sports and Health Sciences
Faculty of Sciences

References

External links
 Official website

B
Universities in Romania
Education in Bacău
Buildings and structures in Bacău County
1990 establishments in Romania